Leslie Fadgyas (30 May 1917 – 2006) was an Australian fencer. He competed in the individual and team sabre events at the 1956 Summer Olympics. He was a longstanding member of the Melbourne-based VRI Fencing Club.

References

1917 births
2006 deaths
Australian male fencers
Olympic fencers of Australia
Fencers at the 1956 Summer Olympics